Cithaerias andromeda, the Andromeda satyr, is a species of butterfly of the family Nymphalidae. It is found from Suriname, French Guiana, Venezuela, Peru, Bolivia and Brazil. Differentiation between subspecies and their corresponding sex is possible through variation in wing pattern as well as genitalia. The presence of brown bands in the hind wings of C. andromeda and a corpus bursae are common features in these female butterflies.

Subspecies
Cithaerias andromeda andromeda (Suriname, French Guiana, Venezuela, Peru, Bolivia, Brazil: Pará)
Cithaerias andromeda esmeralda Doubleday, 1845 (Brazil: Pará)
Cithaerias andromeda bandusia Staudinger, [1887] (Brazil: Amazonas)
Cithaerias andromeda azurina (Zikán, 1942) (Brazil: Amazonas)

References

Butterflies described in 1775
Haeterini
Nymphalidae of South America
Taxa named by Johan Christian Fabricius